The 86th Regiment Illinois Volunteer Infantry was an infantry regiment that served in the Union Army during the American Civil War.

Service
The 86th Illinois Infantry was organized at Peoria, Illinois and mustered into Federal service on August 27, 1862.

The regiment was mustered out on June 6, 1865, and discharged at Chicago, Illinois, on June 21, 1865.

Total strength and casualties
The regiment suffered 3 officers and 73 enlisted men who were killed in action or who died of their wounds and 1 officers and 93 enlisted men who died of disease, for a total of 175 fatalities.

Commanders
Colonel David D. Irons - Died Nashville, Tennessee August 11, 1863.
Lieutenant Colonel Allen L. Fahnestock - Mustered out with the regiment.

See also
List of Illinois Civil War Units
Illinois in the American Civil War

Notes

References
The Civil War Archive

Units and formations of the Union Army from Illinois
1862 establishments in Illinois
Military units and formations established in 1862
Military units and formations disestablished in 1865